Falsodihammus strandiellus is a species of beetle in the family Cerambycidae, and the only species in the genus Falsodihammus. It was described by Breuning in 1942.

References

Lamiini
Beetles described in 1942